Iron Strikers is an association football club based in Mombasa, Kenya. The club currently competes in the Kenyan Provincial League, and plays its home games at the Apostle Grounds.

References

External links

FKF Division One clubs
Football clubs in Kenya